The Book of Discipline constitutes the law and doctrine of the United Methodist Church. It follows similar works for its predecessor denominations. It was originally published in 1784, in the Methodist Episcopal Church, and has been published every four years thereafter following the meeting of the General Conference, which passes legislation that is included in the Book of Discipline. The most recent edition is that of 2016.

The basic unit of reference is the paragraph, not the page, chapter or section.  The paragraphs are numbered consecutively within each chapter or section, but numbers are skipped between chapters or sections.  The paragraph is often only a few lines, but many are several pages long and they can be divided into multiple subdivisions.  Paragraphs are first divided using Arabic numerals (1, 2, 3,...) which can themselves be divided by italicized lower case letters with parentheses (a), b), c), d)...) which may  be divided using Arabic numerals within double parentheses ((1), (2), (3),...) 

Traditionally a list of all the bishops with the year of their election is at the beginning of the book. That is followed by a brief history of the church, then the church constitution, and a statement concerning the doctrine and theology of the church.  The Social Principles of the church follow. Finally the legislative section, by far the largest part of The Discipline, appears.

Notes

External links 
 Book of Discipline, 2016 edition, online

1784 non-fiction books
18th-century Christian texts
Methodist texts
United Methodist Church
Church order